Hepka is a village and ward council of Namkha rural municipality in Humla District in the Karnali Province of north-western Nepal. At the time of the 1991 Nepal census it had a population of 977 persons living in 159 individual households.

See also
Limi
Khagalgaun
Muchu

References

External links
UN map of the municipalities of Dolpa District
Ministry of Federal Affairs and General Administration
MOFAGA GIS MAP

Populated places in Humla District